The Companies Act is an Act of Parliament passed in New Zealand in 1993.

The Act regulates companies, and replaces the earlier Companies Act of 1955.

See also
 Mason v Lewis - Decision holding that the test for determining what reckless trading under section 135 of the Companies Act 1993 is an objective one.
 Allied Concrete Ltd v Meltzer - Decision determining the meaning of "gave value" in section 296(3)(c) of the Companies Act.

References

External links
Text of the Act
original text

Statutes of New Zealand
Corporate law
New Zealand business law